The Cook Political Report with Amy Walter is an American online newsletter that analyzes elections and campaigns for the U.S. Presidency, the United States Senate, the United States House of Representatives, and U.S. governors' offices. Self-described as independent and nonpartisan, it was founded by political analyst Charlie Cook in 1984. Amy Walter is the editor, publisher, and owner.

The Cook Political Report with Amy Walter was previously a hard-copy publication known as The Cook Political Report. The Report moved to an all-online format in 2004.  On July 30, 2021, the publication name changed to "The Cook Political Report with Amy Walter," as Walter took full control of the website and Cook decided to focus on writing and speeches.

Reports include Charlie Cook's two weekly columns for National Journal magazine and National Journal Daily. In addition, changes are generally made each week to The Cook Political Report's House, Senate, and Governors At-A-Glance charts, which list all congressional candidates (together with known potential candidates) running in each state and district in the country.  All House and Senate contests are rated on a seven-category scale; the seven categories are Solid Democratic, Likely Democratic, Lean Democratic, Toss-Up, Lean Republican, Likely Republican, and Solid Republican.

The Cook Political Report with Amy Walter uses the Cook Partisan Voting Index (the PVI), which lists each congressional district in the country according to propensity for voting Democratic or Republican.  Every four years following a presidential election, the PVI is updated to reflect how Democratic or Republican a district is based on how that district voted in the presidential election compared with the rest of the country.

Past predictions

2012
In the presidential election, Cook rated 21 states (including Washington, D.C.) as at least leaning toward the Democratic candidate, Barack Obama; Obama won all 21 of these states. The report rated 23 states as at least leaning toward the Republican nominee, Mitt Romney; Romney won all 23 of these states. Cook also listed seven states as "toss-ups": Colorado, Florida, Iowa, New Hampshire, North Carolina, Ohio, and Virginia. Obama ended up winning all of these states except for North Carolina.

In the race for control of the US Senate, Republican candidates won every Senate seat that Cook listed as at least leaning Republican, while Democrats won every Senate seat that Cook listed as at least leaning Democratic. Cook listed ten Senate races as "toss-ups"; Democrats ended up winning eight of these, while Republicans won the other two.

Among governor's races, Cook correctly predicted that Republicans would win control of the North Carolina governorship, which Democrats had previously controlled. Cook also listed three Democratic-held governorships as "toss-ups": Washington; Montana; and New Hampshire. Democrats ended up holding onto all three.

2014
In the race for control of the US Senate, Cook correctly predicted that Republicans would win control of the Democratic-held Senate seats in Montana, West Virginia, and South Dakota. Cook also listed nine US Senate races as toss-ups; Republicans ended up winning eight of these, while Democrats won only one. Every state Cook listed as at least leaning Republican voted Republican; every state Cook listed as at least leaning Democratic voted Democratic.

Among governor's races, Cook correctly predicted that Democrats would flip the Pennsylvania governorship and that Republicans would flip the Arkansas governorship. Democrats won every state Cook rated as at least leaning Democrat; Republicans won every state Cook rated as at least leaning Republican. Cook also rated 13 governor's races as "toss-ups". Democrats ended up winning 3 of these, while Republicans won the other 9; an independent, Bill Walker, won the toss-up governor's race in Alaska.

2016
In the race for control of the US Senate, Cook rated seven Senate seats as "toss-ups", suggesting the two parties had roughly even odds of winning each election. In the end, Democrats won two of these elections and Republicans won five. Cook contributors had expected the toss-up races to break the other way, with Democrats winning most of them. However, Republicans did not win any Senate races that Cook identified as at least leaning toward Democrats; nor did Democrats win any Senate races Cook identified as at least leaning toward Republicans.

In the presidential election, Cook incorrectly predicted that Hillary Clinton would win Pennsylvania, Michigan, and Wisconsin; it also rated North Carolina, Florida, Maine's 2nd Congressional District, and Nebraska's 2nd Congressional District as "toss-ups". In the end, Trump won all of these states and districts, though for the most part by narrow margins. All of Cook's other final predictions for the presidential election were correct, though Cook had speculated earlier in the year that Democrats had a chance of success in states they did not end up winning, including Arizona and Texas.

Among governor's races, Republicans won every governorship that Cook rated as at least leaning Republican, while Democrats won every governorship Cook rated as at least leaning Democratic. Cook listed six governorships as toss-ups: Missouri, New Hampshire, Vermont, West Virginia, Indiana, and North Carolina. Republicans won Missouri, New Hampshire, Vermont, and Indiana, while Democrats won North Carolina and West Virginia.

2017
New Jersey and Virginia each had open races for governor in 2017. Cook listed the Virginia race as "Lean Democratic" and the New Jersey race as "Likely Democratic". Democrats ended up winning both races by wide margins.

2018
In the race for control of the US House of Representatives, Cook listed 210 seats that at least leaned toward the Democrats; 194 seats that at least leaned toward the Republicans; and 30 seats that were "toss ups". Democrats ended up winning 235 seats, including all of the seats that Cook listed as at least leaning Democratic, as well as most of the "toss ups". However, Cook incorrectly predicted that Republicans would hold onto several seats that Democrats ended up winning, including Oklahoma's 5th Congressional District; South Carolina's 1st Congressional District; and New York's 11th Congressional District.

In the race for control of the US Senate, Democrats won every seat that Cook listed as at least leaning Democratic, while Republicans won every seat Cook listed as at least leaning Republican. Cook also listed 9 Senate races as toss-ups; Democrats won four of these races, while Republicans won the other five.

Among governor's races, Democrats won every seat that Cook listed as at least leaning Democratic, while Republicans won every seat Cook listed as at least leaning Republican. Cook also listed 12 governor's races as toss-ups; Republicans and Democrats ended up each winning 6 of these.

2019
Three states had elections for governor in 2019: Louisiana, Mississippi, and Kentucky. Cook rated the Mississippi race as "Lean Republican"; the Republican candidate ended up winning this race by a 5% margin. Cook rated the Louisiana and Kentucky races as "toss-up"; Democrats ended up narrowly winning both of them.

2020
On October 13, 2020, Cook's Senate and Govs Editor Jessica Taylor tweeted that Democrats were projected to gain 7 seats in the United States Senate. On that date, Cook rated 15 Senate seats as at least leaning toward the GOP; 13 seats as at least leaning toward the Democrats; and 7 "toss-ups.". After the election, every Senate seat rated Lean, Likely, or Solid Democrat was won by the Democratic candidate, and every seat rated Lean, Likely, or Solid Republican was won by the Republican candidate. Republican candidates won 5 of the 7 "toss-up" seats, with the remaining two (both located in Georgia) going into January runoffs. Both runoffs were won by the Democratic candidates.

For the 2020 presidential election, Cook's final Electoral College ratings predicted that Joe Biden would win the presidency with 290 electoral votes. Notably, Cook correctly predicted that Biden would flip Wisconsin, Michigan, and Pennsylvania (which all narrowly voted for Donald Trump in 2016), as well as Arizona and Nebraska's 2nd congressional district. Florida, Georgia, Iowa, Maine's 2nd congressional district, North Carolina, Ohio, and Texas were all rated as Tossups; Trump won all of the tossups with the exception of Georgia.

For the 2020 House elections, Cook rated 18 seats as Likely Democrat, 18 seats as Lean Democrat, 9 Democratic-held seats as Tossups, 18 Republican-held seats as Tossups, 14 seats as Lean Republican, and 12 seats as Likely Republican (with the rest being Solid Democrat or Republican). Here, Cook's projections were significantly more wrong than their 2020 Senate or Presidential ratings: Although they correctly predicted that the Democrats would flip North Carolina's 2nd and 6th districts, as well as Georgia's 7th (all open seats), Republicans won five seats in the Lean Democrat column (California's 48th, Florida's 26th, South Carolina's 1st, Texas' 23rd, Texas' 24th), as well as two seats in the Likely Democrat column (California's 39th district and Florida's 27th district). Republicans also won every seat in the Lean and Likely Republican columns, as well as every Tossup seat (Democrat or Republican-held).

2021
New Jersey and Virginia each had races for governor in 2021. Cook listed the Virginia race as "Tossup" and the New Jersey race as "Solid Democratic". The Republican candidate ended up flipping Virginia by a narrow margin while the Democratic candidate ended up winning New Jersey by a narrow margin.

References

External links
Official website

Online magazines published in the United States
American political websites
Defunct political magazines published in the United States
Magazines established in 1984
Magazines disestablished in 2004
Magazines published in Washington, D.C.
Online magazines with defunct print editions
The Cook Political Report with Amy Walter